OX 2010: A Street Odyssey is the third solo studio album by American rapper Vast Aire, one half of the duo Cannibal Ox. It was released on Fat Beats Records and Man Bites Dog Records in 2011.

Critical reception

At Metacritic, which assigns a weighted average score out of 100 to reviews from mainstream critics, the album received an average score of 61, based on 9 reviews, indicating "generally favorable reviews".

Gregory Heaney of AllMusic gave the album 4 stars out of 5, stating: "The first thing that's clear is that time has been kind to the rapper, whose flow is still as sharp as ever, though perhaps a shade less enigmatic." Thomas Quinlan of Exclaim! commented that "OX hits a few lows, but it has a lot more highlights and is the closest Vast Aire has come to revisiting The Cold Vein since the break-up of Cannibal Ox." Chris Faraone of The Phoenix wrote: "Although it's an imperfect effort in some regards, the somewhat conceptual OX 2010: A Street Odyssey testifies to Vast's highly developed steez, and does so with complements from MCs who effortlessly jibe with his arcane rhyme selections."

Track listing

Personnel
Credits adapted from liner notes.

 Vast Aire – vocals, production (1)
 Kount Fif – production (1–5), mixing, mastering
 Karniege – vocals (3)
 Cappadonna – vocals (5)
 Double A.B. – vocals (6)
 Harry Fraud – production (6, 7)
 Thanos – production (8, 10)
 Kenyattah Black – vocals (9)
 Arewhy – production (9)
 Space – vocals (10)
 Surock – production (11)
 Raekwon – vocals (12)
 Vordul Mega – vocals (12)
 P.O.V. – production (12)
 Melodious Monk – production (13)
 Guilty Simpson – vocals (14)
 Ayatollah – production (14)
 Genesis – vocals (15)
 Brother Hood 603 – production (15)
 RML – art direction
 Orign – artwork
 Lazy Eye Graphics – layout

References

External links
 

2011 albums
Vast Aire albums
Albums produced by Ayatollah
Albums produced by Harry Fraud